Diradius vandykei is a species of webspinner in the family Teratembiidae. It is found in North America.

References

Embioptera
Articles created by Qbugbot
Insects described in 1944